Jacksonville Civic Council (JCC) is a non-partisan group of prominent Jacksonville, Florida business leaders whose goal is to help resolve community issues by studying a problem, proposing one or more solutions, advocating for change, and providing resources and support.
The entity is akin to a brain trust or think tank, but with influence and resources available.

Non-Group
The Jacksonville Non-Group was an informal organization of business leaders established in 1993, initially to support the Duval County Public School's Alliance for World Class Education, which evolved into the Jacksonville Public Education Fund.
Beginning in 2008, the group's members began discussing whether to take a more active leadership role in the community and initiate programs.

Transition
The Jacksonville Chamber of Commerce took a trip to Kansas City, Missouri in October 2009 to look at the peer city's programs for ideas and innovations that could be utilized in Jacksonville.  They saw that Kansas City had used a strong public/private partnership, the Civic Council of Greater Kansas City, to implement serious changes that revitalized their city. Lynn Pappas, then the Non-Group's chairwoman, realized that the members of that organization could perform that same function in Jacksonville. After returning, she shared what she had seen, and at their December meeting, the Non-Group voted to disband and form the Jacksonville Civic Council as a more formal and public group.

Council
The JCC was incorporated on May 17, 2000 with Hugh Greene, John Delaney, Lynn Pappas, Pete Rummell and Steven Halverson listed as officers, but was inactive until December 2009. The JCC is a 501(c)(6) entity, which is a non-profit, tax exempt group like a chamber of commerce. 
Membership requires a minimum commitment of three years, with mandatory meeting attendance and an invitation from one of the officers. The number of members was expected to total approximately 50 and be more diverse than the Non-Group. The JCC is funded by dues based on the size of the member's business, with a minimum of $1,000 and a maximum of $15,000. Pete Rummell was voted chairman, and the JCC approved hiring an Executive Director; Susie Wiles served as interim E.D. during the search. Wiles, then a  partner at IF Marketing & Advertising, also provided administrative support for the JCC's formation.

Poll
To determine what Jacksonville residents viewed as the most critical issues, the opinion research firm American Viewpoint was hired to design a poll and conduct a six-week study in March 2010.
Five issues were identified:

Balanced budget/fiscal responsibility
More jobs
Better public schools
Public safety/crime
Jaguars staying in Jacksonville

Staff
Don Shea was hired as Executive Director for the JCC in July and assumed the position in September 2010, working from offices in the Haskell Building. A former director of the Economic Development Authority in Shreveport, Louisiana, he brought over three decades of relevant experience to the council. Steve Halverson replaced Pete Rummell as JCC chairman before Shea resigned in early 2013 and returned to Louisiana. Once again, Susie Wiles served as interim director while a national search was conducted. On July 30, 2013, Jacksonville lawyer Jeanne Miller was named as the new Executive Director. Previously Chief Legislative Counsel in the City of Jacksonville's Office of General Counsel, Miller also held several leadership positions with the Jacksonville Economic Development Commission as well as serving as General Counsel and Vice President of Strategic Initiatives at Florida State College at Jacksonville immediately prior to joining JCC. Upon her appointment, Miller reaffirmed that downtown redevelopment was the council's first goal and commented, “What I’ve learned is I really love to put together deals and bring together partnerships. I’ve had a love and passion for this kind of work for a long time.”

Esther Lizzmore
| Executive Assistant

Savannah Sizer
| Public Policy Research Assistant

References

External links

Citizen Priority Poll

Non-profit organizations based in Jacksonville, Florida
Think tanks based in the United States
Organizations established in 2009
2009 establishments in Florida